In Greek mythology, Aethra or Aithra was a name applied to four different individuals:
 Aethra, name of one of the Oceanids, the 3000 daughters of Oceanus and Tethys. She is sometimes called the wife of Atlas and mother of the Pleiades, Hyades (more usually the offspring of Pleione) and Hyas.
 Aethra (possibly same as above) is, in one source, called the wife of Hyperion, rather than Theia, and mother of Helios, Eos, and Selene.
 Aethra, daughter of King Pittheus of Troezen and mother of Theseus either by Poseidon or Aegeus. This is the same Aethra who went to Troy with Helen as one of her two handmaidens.
 Aethra, wife of the Spartan Phalanthus. She fulfilled the prophecy given to her husband by her tears, after which he conquered Tarentum for himself.

Notes

References 

Apollodorus, The Library with an English Translation by Sir James George Frazer, F.B.A., F.R.S. in 2 Volumes, Cambridge, MA, Harvard University Press; London, William Heinemann Ltd. 1921. ISBN 0-674-99135-4. Online version at the Perseus Digital Library. Greek text available from the same website.
Bell, Robert E., Women of Classical Mythology: A Biographical Dictionary. ABC-Clio. 1991. .
Gaius Julius Hyginus, Astronomica from The Myths of Hyginus translated and edited by Mary Grant. University of Kansas Publications in Humanistic Studies. Online version at the Topos Text Project.
Gaius Julius Hyginus, Fabulae from The Myths of Hyginus translated and edited by Mary Grant. University of Kansas Publications in Humanistic Studies. Online version at the Topos Text Project.
Graves, Robert, The Greek Myths, Harmondsworth, London, England, Penguin Books, 1960. 
Homer, The Iliad with an English Translation by A.T. Murray, Ph.D. in two volumes. Cambridge, MA., Harvard University Press; London, William Heinemann, Ltd. 1924. . Online version at the Perseus Digital Library.
Homer, Homeri Opera in five volumes. Oxford, Oxford University Press. 1920. . Greek text available at the Perseus Digital Library.
Lucius Mestrius Plutarchus, Lives with an English Translation by Bernadotte Perrin. Cambridge, MA. Harvard University Press. London. William Heinemann Ltd. 1914. 1. Online version at the Perseus Digital Library. Greek text available from the same website.
Pausanias, Description of Greece with an English Translation by W.H.S. Jones, Litt.D., and H.A. Ormerod, M.A., in 4 Volumes. Cambridge, MA, Harvard University Press; London, William Heinemann Ltd. 1918. . Online version at the Perseus Digital Library
Pausanias, Graeciae Descriptio. 3 vols. Leipzig, Teubner. 1903.  Greek text available at the Perseus Digital Library.
 Publius Ovidius Naso, Fasti translated by James G. Frazer. Online version at the Topos Text Project.
 Publius Ovidius Naso, Fasti. Sir James George Frazer. London; Cambridge, MA. William Heinemann Ltd.; Harvard University Press. 1933. Latin text available at the Perseus Digital Library.

Oceanids
Women in Greek mythology